Duneaton Water is a river in South Lanarkshire, Scotland. It joins the River Clyde at Abington.

References 

Rivers of South Lanarkshire
River Clyde